Anthony Chemut (born 17 December 1992) is a Kenyan middle distance runner that specialises in the 800 metres. He was part of the Kenyan team for the 2012 Summer Olympics.

Competition record

References

External links

1992 births
Living people
Kenyan male middle-distance runners
Olympic athletes of Kenya
Athletes (track and field) at the 2012 Summer Olympics
People from Nandi County
21st-century Kenyan people